Libolo is a municipality in Cuanza Sul Province in Angola, with the town of Calulo as the municipal seat.
The municipality is home to the  notable Angolan sports club Recreativo do Libolo.

References

Populated places in Cuanza Sul Province
Municipalities of Angola